Misurata University is one of state universities in Libya, located in Libya's third largest city ‘Misurata’. The university provides nationally and internationally recognized educational services that equip the members of the academic community with competencies and values that will better serve the nation. The university has 19 different faculties around the city and it offers more than 150 undergraduate courses. It endeavors to provide higher education and training quality to its students and staff and prepare them to take part in modernizing and developing the national society and economy. Misurata University also aims to promote, by research and other means, the advancement of knowledge and to apply suggestions and recommendations to economic, social, cultural, and technological problems.

History
Misurata university was originally established in 1984.

In 2010, it was named Misurata university after merging the University of the Seventh of October with the University of Al-Merqib, based on the decision of the General People’s Committee No. (149) for the year 2010 AD for restructuring Libyan universities.

Faculties
Misurata University has 19 faculties offering more than 100 areas of study.
 Faculty of Science
 Faculty of Engineering
 Faculty of Education
 College of Economics and Political Science
 Faculty of Information Technology
 Faculty of Agriculture
 Faculty of Arts
 Faculty of Law 
 Faculty of Arts and Media
 Faculty of Medicine
 Faculty of Languages and Translation
 Faculty of Islamic Studies
 Faculty of Physical Education and Sports Sciences
 Faculty of Dentistry
 Faculty of Nursing
 Faculty of Pharmacy
 Faculty of Environmental and Natural Resources
 Faculty of Veterinary Medicine
 Faculty of Humanities and Applied Sciences- Taurga

References

 https://www.misuratau.edu.ly/en/

External links
 Misrata University Official Website

Educational institutions established in 1984
Misrata
Universities in Libya
1984 establishments in Libya